Sibir Novosibirsk may refer to one of the following sports clubs based in Novosibirsk, Russia:
HC Sibir Novosibirsk, an ice hockey club
FC Sibir Novosibirsk, a football club